The Federal Correctional Institution, La Tuna (FCI La Tuna) is a low-security United States federal prison for male inmates in Anthony, Texas. It is operated by the Federal Bureau of Prisons, a division of the United States Department of Justice. A satellite prison camp, located adjacent to the facility, houses minimum-security inmates.

Letters from La Tuna
From May to September 2013, the El Paso Times published a series of letters written by Bob Jones, a longtime El Paso businessman serving a 10-year sentence on corruption and fraud convictions at FCI La Tuna. Known as "Letters from La Tuna," Jones wrote the letters to his family to "warn you and all of our loved ones and friends away from any misdeeds or illegal behavior" and give readers insight into the harsh consequences of breaking the law. In the first article, Jones described being detained in a private prison in Otero County, New Mexico after he was sentenced on February 17, 2011 and contracting E. coli bacteria from undercooked food and becoming ill with dysentery. Still sick, he was transferred to FCI La Tuna in May 2011:

I was loaded with nine other men into a van and taken to La Tuna Federal Correctional Institution, throwing up all the way. Once I was checked in, I was taken by wheelchair to my new home -- and a different type of hell in Unit 6 (handicapped unit) at La Tuna. The things that saved my life were my "cellies" (my cell mates, the other five men in the six-man cell that I was assigned to live in, a 10-by-10-foot room). These men fed me and wheeled me to the bathroom, food service (sometimes) and to the medical office.

Jones subsequently suffered kidney failure and was sent to a local hospital twice, each stay lasting about 30 days before he was sent back to FCI La Tuna. Jones wrote that while in the hospital, he was chained to the bed and was watched by guards 24 hours a day. However, Jones noted that the conditions at FCI La Tuna were better in comparison to the private prison he came from: "La Tuna is far more what I expected of prison -- food, guards, management bureaucracy" and added "the inmates [at FCI La Tuna] are mostly men who are in prison for far too long a term for their crimes."

Notable inmates (current and former)

See also 

List of United States federal prisons
Federal Bureau of Prisons
Incarceration in the United States

References

External links 
http://www.bop.gov/locations/institutions/lat/index.jsp

Buildings and structures in El Paso County, Texas
La Tuna
La Tuna